The 2021 season was the 107th in Remo's existence. This season Remo participated in the Campeonato Brasileiro Série B, the Campeonato Paraense, Copa Verde and the Copa do Brasil.

Remo finished the Campeonato Brasileiro Série B in the 17th place, and was relegated to the Série C. In the Campeonato Paraense, the club was eliminated in the semifinals to Tuna Luso and finished in 3rd place after beating Castanhal 3–0 in the third place match. In the Copa Verde, Remo won the unprecedented title in an undefeated way after beating Vila Nova on penalties. The team played seven games, winning three and drawing four. In the Copa do Brasil, Remo was eliminated in the third round by Atlético Mineiro.

Players

Squad information
Numbers in parentheses denote appearances as substitute.

Top scorers

Disciplinary record

Kit
Supplier: Kappa (until 8 July 2021); Volt Sport / Main sponsor: Banpará

Transfers

Transfers in

Transfers out

Notes

Competitions

Campeonato Brasileiro Série B

Matches

Campeonato Paraense

Group stage

Matches

Final stage

Quarter-finals

Semi-finals

Third place play-off

Copa Verde

Round of 16

Quarter-finals

Semi-finals

Finals

Copa do Brasil

First round

Second round

Third round

References

External links
Official Site 
Remo 100% 

2021 season
Clube do Remo seasons
2021 in Brazilian football